Zwölf Stücke, Op. 65, is a group of twelve pieces for organ by Max Reger, composed in Munich in 1902. They were published by C. F. Peters in Leipzig in August of that year, in two books (Heft) of six pieces each.

History 
The pieces are character pieces of medium difficulty, as a contrast to his major organ works. Reger had written such works already as a student in Wiesbaden. He turned to the organ in Weiden. On 31 December 1901, Reger approached the publisher Henri Hinrichsen of C. F. Peters to find out if he was ready to print in 1902 piano works, songs or chamber music. Henri answered that would prefer organ works easy to play ("leichte Spielbarkeit"). Reger composed 15 pieces in Munich in 1902, but Peters published twelve in Leipzig in August 1902, in two books (Heft) of six pieces each. Both dedicatees were established organists of an older generation, but could not be won to promote Reger's music. A reviewer of the first print wrote in the Monthly Musical Record: "The great art of expressing thoughts simply – in other words, concealing the art – is not to be found here; the composer is still in his storm and stress period.". The three unpublished pieces were used for the collection Zwölf Stücke, Op. 80 in 1904.

The pieces have been performed individually or in sequence. In Reger's lifetime, performers often combined movements from different collections. Reger himself played Canzone for the Welte Philharmonic Organ. In the edition of Reger's complete works by the Max-Reger-Institute, they were published in volume 6.

Structure 
The titles and keys are:
 Rhapsodie (Rhapsody), C-sharp minor
 Capriccio (Capriccio), G major
 Pastorale (Pastorale), A major
 Consolation
 Improvisation (Improvisation), A minor
 Fuge (Fugue), A minor
 Präludium (Prelude), D minor
 Fuge (Fugue), D major
 Canzone (Canzona), E-flat major
 Scherzo (Scherzo), D minor
 Toccata (Toccata), E minor
 Fuge (Fugue), E major

References

Bibliography

External links 
 
 Zwölf Stücke für die Orgel, op. 65 [manuscript score] The Library of Congress
 12 Stücke op. 65 / Heft 1 Edition Peters
 12 Stücke op. 65 / Heft 2 Edition Peters
 Max Reger / 1898 Rückkehr nach Weiden (in German) max-reger-orgel.de

Compositions for organ
1902 compositions
Compositions by Max Reger